Ten Thirteen Productions is a production company founded by Chris Carter in 1993, which produced four television series and two films (The X-Files and The X-Files: I Want to Believe). The company was named after Carter's birthday, October 13. The Ten Thirteen offices are located in Santa Monica, Los Angeles, California.

History

The company was founded when Carter began his series The X-Files in 1993. With the success of The X-Files continuously growing, in 1996 the company embarked on a new series; Millennium. The series lasted for three seasons. In 1998, they released a film simply titled The X-Files, which grossed $189,198,313. In 1999, as Millennium was canceled, a third series was put into production, Harsh Realm. Despite critical praise, it was canceled after only nine episodes. In 2001 they decided to create a direct spin-off from The X-Files and the result was The Lone Gunmen. This was canceled after one season.

Produced material

Television series (1993–2018)
The X-Files (1993–2002, 2016–2018)
Millennium (1996–1999)
Harsh Realm (1999–2000)
The Lone Gunmen (2001)

Films
The X-Files (1998)
The X-Files: I Want to Believe (2008)

Notes and references 

Television production companies of the United States
Mass media companies established in 1993